Bucculatrix altera is a moth in the family Bucculatricidae. It was described by Svetlana Seksjaeva in 1989. It is found in the Russian Far East (Primorsky Krai) and Japan (Hokkaido).

The wingspan is 7-8.2 mm. The forewings are white with some light ocherous streaks and patches. The hindwings are whitish grey.

References

Natural History Museum Lepidoptera generic names catalog

Bucculatricidae
Moths described in 1989
Moths of Asia
Moths of Japan